Margherita de' Medici (31 May 1612 – 6 February 1679) was Duchess of Parma and Piacenza by her marriage to Odoardo Farnese, Duke of Parma. Margherita was regent of Piacenza in 1635, and regent of the entire duchy from 1646 until 1648 during the minority of her son.

Life
She was the fourth of eight children and the second daughter born to Cosimo II de' Medici, Grand Duke of Tuscany and his wife Maria Magdalena of Austria. Hence Margherita was a descendant of the Holy Roman Emperors.

Margherita became engaged to Odoardo Farnese, Duke of Parma in 1620. They married in 1628 when he came of age. The marriage had been strongly desired by Odoardo's father, Ranuccio, who saw it as a means of strengthening the alliance between the Duchy of Parma and the Grand Duchy of Tuscany, then ruled by the Medici family.

Duchess of Parma
The marriage took place on 11 October 1628 in Florence. The wedding celebrations were accompanied by much spectacle and pageantry, including the performance of Marco da Gagliano's opera La Flora, composed especially for the occasion. To welcome the couple back to Parma, Mercury and Mars, with music by Claudio Monteverdi and text by Claudio Achillini was performed in the Teatro Farnese.

The years in which the couple ruled over Parma were marked by the plague of 1630 and the contrast between the splendour of the court and the tax burden to which they had subjected their subjects. The tax money was used to improve Odoardo's armies. The Duke also had a pro-French policy.

According to portraiture and the sources of the time, Margherita was a beautiful woman, as well as amiable and well-educated. Unlike his predecessors, the duke was very devoted and loyal to her and there were never any sources that claimed Odoardo had illegitimate children.

Regency
On 11 September 1646, Odoardo died. Their eldest son, Ranuccio was not yet old enough to rule the Duchy alone so his mother, Margherita acted as regent until her son was old enough to govern alone two years later. She served in co-regency with her former brother-in-law, her son‘s uncle, Francesco Maria Farnese. 
In 1648, her son was declared of legal majority and thus ended her regency.

Margherita outlived at least four of her children. She died in Parma on 6 February 1679.

Issue
Caterina Farnese (2 October 1629) died at birth.
Ranuccio II Farnese (17 September 1630 – 11 December 1694) married (1) Margaret Yolande of Savoy, (2) Isabella d'Este, (3) Maria d'Este.
Alessandro Farnese (10 January 1635 – 18 February 1689), Governor of the Habsburg Netherlands died unmarried.
Onorato Farnese (24 January 1636 – 2 November 1656) died unmarried.
Caterina Farnese (3 September 1637 – 24 April 1684) a nun
Maria Maddalena Farnese (15 July 1638 – 11 March 1693) died unmarried.
Pietro Farnese (4 April 1639 – 4 March 1677) died unmarried.
Ottavio Farnese (5 January 1641 – 4 August 1641) died in infancy.

Ancestry

References

1612 births
1679 deaths
Margherita
Nobility from Florence
House of Farnese
Regents of Parma
17th-century Italian nobility
17th-century Italian women
Duchesses of Parma
17th-century women rulers
Daughters of monarchs